José Ramos (23 February 1919 – 11 May 1969) was an Argentine footballer. He played in eleven matches for the Argentina national football team from 1942 to 1946. He was also part of Argentina's squad for the 1946 South American Championship.

References

External links
 
 

1919 births
1969 deaths
Argentine footballers
Argentina international footballers
Place of birth missing
Association football defenders
Club Atlético Lanús footballers
Club Atlético River Plate footballers